Villa del Prado (Spanish for Town of the Meadow) is a city in Baja California in Tijuana Municipality. The city had a population of 12,303 as of 2010.

See also

References

Further reading

Populated places in Tijuana Municipality